The Yuma City Hall is a historic building in Yuma, Arizona. It was built in 1921, and it served as Yuma's city hall for many years. It was designed by Lyman & Place in the Spanish Colonial Revival architectural style. It has been listed on the National Register of Historic Places since December 7, 1982.

References

External links

Buildings and structures in Yuma, Arizona
City and town halls on the National Register of Historic Places in Arizona
National Register of Historic Places in Yuma County, Arizona
Spanish Colonial Revival architecture in Arizona
Government buildings completed in 1921
1921 establishments in Arizona